"I Don't Want to Miss a Thing" is a song performed by American hard rock band Aerosmith as the theme song for the 1998 sci-fi disaster film Armageddon, in which lead singer Steven Tyler's daughter Liv starred. It is one of four songs performed by the band for the film, the other three being "What Kind of Love Are You On", "Come Together", and "Sweet Emotion". The power ballad was written by Diane Warren, who originally envisioned it would be performed by "Celine Dion or somebody like that". The song received its airplay premiere on May 12, 1998, and was officially added to radio a week later.

In the United States, "I Don't Want to Miss a Thing" was originally supposed to be a radio-only single from Armageddon: The Album, but due to popular demand, Columbia Records issued the song commercially in August 1998. It subsequently debuted at number one on the Billboard Hot 100, giving the band their first and only number-one single in their home country. The song also peaked at number one for multiple weeks in several other countries, including Australia, Ireland, and Norway. In the United Kingdom, it sold over one million copies and reached number four on the UK Singles Chart.

The song was covered by American country music singer Mark Chesnutt for his album of the same name. In early 1999, his version was a top-twenty hit on the Billboard Hot 100 while also topping the Billboard Hot Country Songs charts.

Inspiration and background
In 1997, Diane Warren was watching Barbara Walters interview James Brolin and Barbra Streisand. Brolin said he missed Streisand when they were asleep, and Warren wrote down the words "I don't want to miss a thing", before there was even a song. "When I first heard it," recalled drummer Joey Kramer, "it was just a demo with piano and singing. It was difficult to imagine what kind of touch Aerosmith could put on it and make it our own… As soon as we began playing it as a band, then it instantly became an Aerosmith song."

Critical reception
The song received generally positive reviews from critics. Billboard wrote, "If you're among the many who adore Aerosmith when it indulges in power balladry à la "Angel", then you're in for a real treat. This tune from the imminent soundtrack to "Armageddon" shows the enduring rock troupe happily giving in to the romance of superstar tunesmith Diane Warren's sweet tune—but with an appropriate dash of guitar-juiced melodrama. Steven Tyler's signature belting is so intensely over the top that he frequently seems to be shrieking. It's a high-voltage performance that is matched by a collision of rock-styled instrumentation and grand, faux-classical orchestration. It's a recipe that will prove irresistible to programmers at top 40 and AC formats." 

Birmingham Evening Mail commented, "Songwriter Diane Warren weaves her magic again with a bombastic power ballad from the 'Armageddon' movie soundtrack. It perfectly suits Steven Tyler's sleazy vocals as the track moves towards its strings-soaked conclusion." Daily Record called it an "epic ballad which has Steve Tyler impersonating of Bryan Adams". They also noted it as an "end-of-the-night disco favourite."

Impact and legacy
This song was Aerosmith's biggest hit, debuting at number one on the US Billboard Hot 100, where it stayed for four weeks in September, and reaching number one around the world, including Australia, Germany, Greece, Ireland, Austria, Norway, Italy, the Netherlands, and Switzerland. It helped introduce Aerosmith to a new generation and remains a slow dance staple.

On November 28, 2015, boxer Tyson Fury sang the song after beating long reigning heavyweight champion Wladimir Klitschko in Düsseldorf, Germany. Fury sang the song again after beating Tom Schwarz in 2019 at the MGM Grand Arena in Las Vegas.

Track listings

US CD and cassette single
 "I Don't Want to Miss a Thing" – 4:58
 "Animal Crackers" – 2:36
 "Taste of India" (rock remix) – 5:52

UK CD1
 "I Don't Want to Miss a Thing" – 4:58
 "Taste of India" (rock remix) – 5:52
 "Animal Crackers" – 2:36

UK CD2
 "I Don't Want to Miss a Thing" – 4:58
 "Pink" (live) – 3:45
 "Crash" – 4:26

UK 7-inch picture disc and European CD single
 "I Don't Want to Miss a Thing" – 4:58
 "Taste of India" (rock remix) – 5:52

European maxi-CD single
 "I Don't Want to Miss a Thing" – 4:58
 "Taste of India" (rock remix) – 5:52
 "Crash" – 4:25
 "Animal Crackers" – 2:36

Australian and Japanese CD single
 "I Don't Want to Miss a Thing" – 4:58
 "I Don't Want to Miss a Thing" (rock mix) – 4:58
 "Taste of India" (rock remix) – 5:52
 "Animal Crackers" – 2:36

Personnel
Personnel are adapted from the Armageddon soundtrack's liner notes.

Aerosmith
 Steven Tyler – lead and backing vocals
 Joe Perry – lead guitars
 Brad Whitford – rhythm guitars
 Tom Hamilton – bass guitars
 Joey Kramer – drums and percussion

Additional personnel
 Suzie Katayama – string arrangements

Charts

Weekly charts

Year-end charts

Decade-end charts

Certifications

Release history

Mark Chesnutt version

In December 1998, country music artist Mark Chesnutt released a cover version of the song. His rendition is the first single and title track from his 1999 album of the same name.

Chesnutt chose to cover the song through the suggestion of his record producer Mark Wright, who had heard the Aerosmith version on his car radio. According to Wright, he and Chesnutt only listened to Aerosmith's rendition twice before recording, in order to allow Chesnutt to come up with a rendition that was "his". Because the two thought that his version had potential as a single, his label Decca Records withdrew his then-current single "Wherever You Are" in late 1998 and began promotion of "I Don't Want to Miss a Thing" instead. Chesnutt also said that he chose to do the song because he thought that it would help revive his then-flagging album sales and chart performance. 

Despite showing favor toward the cover at the time, Chesnutt remarked in 2016 that he "didn’t want to cut it" and that, even though his version topped the country music charts and was successful on radio, sales were poor for both the single and the corresponding album. He also noted that soon afterward, he exited his label after refusing their offer to cover another pop song.

Weekly charts

Year-end charts

Notes

References

External links
 

1990s ballads
1998 singles
1998 songs
1999 singles
Aerosmith songs
Barbra Streisand
Billboard Hot 100 number-one singles
Columbia Records singles
Decca Records singles
European Hot 100 Singles number-one singles
Glam metal ballads
Glam metal songs
Hard rock ballads
Irish Singles Chart number-one singles
Mark Chesnutt songs
Music videos directed by Francis Lawrence
Number-one singles in Australia
Number-one singles in Austria
Number-one singles in Germany
Number-one singles in Greece
Number-one singles in Iceland
Number-one singles in Italy
Number-one singles in Norway
Number-one singles in Switzerland
Pop ballads
American pop rock songs
Song recordings produced by Matt Serletic
Song recordings produced by Mark Wright (record producer)
Songs about heartache
Songs about loneliness
Songs written by Diane Warren
Songs written for films